Delegan-e Sheykh Cheragh (also Romanized as Delegān-e Sheykh Cherāgh; also known as Dalgān-e Pā’īn and Delegān-e Pā’īn) is a village in Negur Rural District, Dashtiari District, Chabahar County, Sistan and Baluchestan Province, Iran. At the 2006 census, its population was 466, in 92 families.

References 

Populated places in Chabahar County